Davis Junction is a village in Ogle County, Illinois, United States. The population was 2,512 at the 2020 census. Named for Jeremiah Davis, it is located where the Illinois Railway Rockford Line and the Canadian Pacific Railway (ex-Milwaukee Road/Soo Line Railroad) Chicago Subdivision intersect along Illinois Route 72. It is the site of the Orchard Hills Landfill - one of the largest in the United States.

History
Jeremiah Davis laid out Davis Junction in the 1870s, and named the settlement for himself. A post office has been in operation at Davis Junction since 1875.

Geography
Davis Junction is located at  (42.101928, -89.093696).

Demographics

As of the census of 2000, there were 491 people, 165 households, and 132 families residing in Davis Junction. The racial makeup of the village was 98.37% White, 0.41% Asian, 0.41% from other races, and 0.81% from two or more races. Hispanic or Latino of any race were 1.02% of the population.

There were 165 households, out of which 47.9% had children under the age of 18 living with them, 66.7% were married couples living together, 7.3% had a female householder with no husband present, and 20.0% were non-families. 15.8% of all households were made up of individuals, and 6.7% had someone living alone who was 65 years of age or older. The average household size was 2.98 and the average family size was 3.37.

In the village, the population was spread out, with 34.0% under the age of 18, 6.5% from 18 to 24, 37.9% from 25 to 44, 13.8% from 45 to 64, and 7.7% who were 65 years of age or older. The median age was 31 years. For every 100 females, there were 107.2 males. For every 100 females age 18 and over, there were 97.6 males.

The median income for a household in the village was $47,375, and the median income for a family was $51,250. Males had a median income of $36,875 versus $22,917 for females. The per capita income for the village was $16,915. About 2.5% of families and 2.6% of the population were below the poverty line, including none of those under age 18 and 23.1% of those age 65 or over.

Notable person
Charles W. Baker (1876-1963), Illinois state legislator and farmer, owned a farm in Davis Junction.

References

Villages in Ogle County, Illinois
Villages in Illinois
1875 establishments in Illinois